Burnet James (26 October 1886 – 26 September 1915) was an English cricketer. He was a left-handed batsman and left-arm slow bowler who played for Gloucestershire. He was born in Stoke Bishop, Bristol and died in Langemark.

James made three first-class appearances for the team during the 1914 season, scoring an innings-best 10 runs on his debut against Warwickshire.

All three of James' first-class appearances finished in defeat for Gloucestershire.

James was with the Royal Field Artillery and Royal Flying Corps during World War I and died in Belgium at the age of 28.

References

External links
Burnet James at Cricket Archive 

1886 births
1915 deaths
English cricketers
Gloucestershire cricketers
Cricketers from Bristol
British military personnel killed in World War I